The Irish Road To Cheltenham was a five-part observational documentary series following five National Hunt Jockeys throughout the 2012/13 National Hunt season and in their ultimate objective, to compete at the Cheltenham Festival in March 2013.

The documentary gave access into their lives and a glimpse of the physical and mental lengths they go through both on and off the race track. The first episode aired on 7 March 2013 on RTÉ 1.

Jockeys Featured
Davy Russell
Nina Carberry
Andrew Lynch
Andrew McNamara
Robert Power

References

External links
The Irish Road To Cheltenham at RTÉ
Video Preview of the series

2013 Irish television series debuts
RTÉ original programming
2013 Irish television series endings